Kikwit is the largest city of Kwilu Province, lying on the Kwilu River in the southwestern part of the Democratic Republic of the Congo. Kikwit is also known in the region under the nickname "The Mother". The population is approximately 458,000 (2017). An important commercial centre, it is home to a stadium and is known for its traditional dances, in particular the Bapende dancers whose geographic origin centers on the village of Gungu. Bapende dancers often wear traditional costumes comprising colorful masks and attire made from raffia.  Kikwit is also home to an airport (Kikwit Airport) and is connected to the capital Kinshasa by a new road and river transport.

In 1995 the city saw a serious outbreak of the deadly Ebola virus.

Singer King Kester Emeneya was born in Kikwit in 1956. In April 2014, a tribute concert held in Kikwit to honor King Kester Emeneya ended in disaster, and at least thirteen people in the stadium died in a stampede following a power failure.

See also
University of Kikwit
Matthew Lukwiya
The Pende people are also from Idiofa and Tshikapa (Kasai). The Pende dancers are known as Mungandji (1) or Mingandji (many).

References

External links
An article about Kikwit in Britannica Online Encyclopedia

 
Populated places in Kwilu Province